Gianluca Pagliuca  (born 18 December 1966) is an Italian football coach and former professional goalkeeper.

He is regarded by pundits as one of the greatest goalkeepers of his generation, and one of Italy's best keepers ever. Throughout his career, he played for Sampdoria, Inter, Bologna, and Ascoli in Italy, winning several domestic and international trophies. At international level, he represented Italy at three FIFA World Cups (1990, 1994, and 1998), most notably reaching the 1994 World Cup final as Italy's starting goalkeeper.

He is the player with the fifth most appearances (592), and the second best penalty-stopper (24 saves) in Serie A behind Samir Handanović, although other specialists such as Júlio César and Handanović have a higher success rate.

Club career
Pagliuca was born in Bologna. In his club career, he played for Sampdoria (1987–94), Internazionale (1994–99), Bologna (1999–2006), and Ascoli (2006–07). His most notable successes with Sampdoria include one Cup Winners' Cup and one Scudetto; he also reached a UEFA Champions League final, losing 1–0 to Barcelona in 1992, at Wembley, in spite of his impressive performance.

In 1994, he moved from Sampdoria to Internazionale from a then world record fee for a goalkeeper of £7 million. With the nerazzurri he reached two consecutive UEFA Cup finals, losing the first one against Schalke 04 in 1997 and winning the second one in 1998, when he captained the side to a 3–0 win over Lazio. Pagliuca left Inter in 1999, moving to his home town club, Bologna, after the former Juventus boss Marcello Lippi took charge of Inter and signed Angelo Peruzzi from his former club.

After Bologna were relegated to Serie B in 2004–05, despite Pagliuca's outstanding season, he stayed with the club for one more year; then he returned to Serie A, accepting a contract with Ascoli for one year starting in summer of 2006. On 17 September 2006, Pagliuca set the record for most Serie A appearances for a goalkeeper, overtaking Dino Zoff, as he started against Messina. He retired at the end of the season.

International career

After taking part in the 1990 World Cup without playing a minute, Pagliuca overtook Walter Zenga, Stefano Tacconi and Luca Marchegiani, becoming first choice goalkeeper for Italy at the 1994 World Cup under Arrigo Sacchi. He received the dubious honour of being the first goalkeeper to be sent off in a World Cup match, when he was dismissed for handling outside his area against Norway. However, he returned after suspension to feature from the quarter-finals onwards with his team losing the final to Brazil in a penalty shootout. Despite the loss, Pagliuca became the first ever goalkeeper to save a penalty from a shootout in a World Cup final, denying Marcio Santos his shot.

In 1995, Pagliuca's international career was halted by the emergence of Juventus goalkeeper Angelo Peruzzi, his perceived career rival, and it would be two years before he returned to the Italy senior squad, although he took part at the Olympics with the under-21 side as an overage player in 1996. Under Cesare Maldini, Pagliuca would have taken part to the 1998 World Cup only as a back-up, but he earned the starting spot because of a last-minute injury to Peruzzi. He made one of the saves of the tournament, again against Norway, when he shot out a hand to prevent Tore André Flo's point-blank header from netting. However, Italy lost against host country France in the quarter-final after the penalty shootout, even though Pagliuca blocked Bixente Lizarazu's shot.

After the tournament, the emergence of fellow keepers Francesco Toldo and Gianluigi Buffon (who were, themselves, Pagliuca's deputies in the 1998 World Cup), along with Peruzzi's recovery from his injury, put an end to Pagliuca's international career on 39 caps.

Post-retirement career 
Pagliuca went into coaching upon retirement. He re-joined his hometown club Bologna as a youth coach in 2014, and was appointed goalkeeping coach of the club's primavera (under 19) team in 2016, a role he continues to occupy. He also provides regular interviews and commentary to the Italian and international sporting media.

Style of play
An agile, consistent and athletic goalkeeper, Pagliuca was renowned for his excellent reactions, diving saves, and penalty-stopping abilities, as well as his control of the ball, accurate distribution, and deep goal kicks with his left foot. In addition to being very gifted acrobatics-wise, he also possessed a good positional sense. Although he was capable of coming off the line to handle crosses, he performed better between the posts. Nicknamed The Wall, due to his goalkeeping abilities and consistency, he also distinguished himself by his strong temper, which occasionally had a negative impact on his performances, when he let his emotions get the better of him.

Under coaches Sven-Göran Eriksson and Arrigo Sacchi, who relied on high defensive lines, Pagliuca used to play as a sweeper-keeper. Known for his dedication, physical conditioning, and work-rate, Pagliuca also stood out for his ability to avoid injury and longevity throughout his career.

Personal life

Pagluica was born in Bologna, Emilia-Romagna and supports local side Bologna F.C. 1909, to which he also made 248 appearances at between 1999 and 2006. Furthermore, Pagluica has also spoken of his support for Premier League club Aston Villa F.C.

His son Mattia Pagliuca is also a professional footballer. He made his Serie A debut in December 2020 for Bologna F.C. 1909 as a winger.

Career statistics

Club

International

Honours
Sampdoria
 Serie A: 1990–91
 Coppa Italia: 1987–88, 1988–89, 1993–94
 Supercoppa Italiana: 1991
 UEFA Cup Winners' Cup: 1989–90

Inter
 UEFA Cup: 1997–98

Italy
 FIFA World Cup runner-up: 1994

Individual
Pirata d'Oro (Internazionale Player Of The Year): 1995
 Guerin d'Oro: 1996–97, 2004–05
Inter Milan Hall of Fame: 2021

Orders
 5th Class / Knight: Cavaliere Ordine al Merito della Repubblica Italiana: 1991

References

External links

 
 
 

Living people
1966 births
Association football goalkeepers
Italian footballers
Italy international footballers
Italy under-21 international footballers
U.C. Sampdoria players
Inter Milan players
Bologna F.C. 1909 players
Ascoli Calcio 1898 F.C. players
Serie A players
Serie B players
Olympic footballers of Italy
Footballers at the 1988 Summer Olympics
Footballers at the 1996 Summer Olympics
1990 FIFA World Cup players
1994 FIFA World Cup players
1998 FIFA World Cup players
Italy B international footballers
UEFA Cup winning players
Knights of the Order of Merit of the Italian Republic